The 2020 Dominica Premier League is the 55th season of the Dominica Premier League, the top tier of association football in Dominica. The season began on 12 January 2020. The season was suspended on 15 March due to the COVID-19 pandemic in Dominica and resumed play on 31 July. South East FC won the league title.

Standings

Stadiums

References 

Dominica Premiere League seasons
Dominica
football
Dominica